Jean Lefèvre was a Belgian athlete. He competed in three events at the 1920 Summer Olympics.

References

Year of birth missing
Year of death missing
Athletes (track and field) at the 1920 Summer Olympics
Belgian male long jumpers
Belgian male javelin throwers
Belgian male sprinters
Olympic athletes of Belgium
Place of birth missing